Match of the Day 2 is a Premier League football highlights programme. It is a companion show to Match of the Day, usually broadcast on BBC One on Sunday evenings, thus facilitating coverage of the respective week's PL matches that were played since the broadcast of the initial programme.

Format
Match of the Day 2 follows the same format as Match of the Day, with highlights of the day's Premier League football, followed by post-match interviews and tactical analysis.

The show originally featured a "Top 5" countdown based around a current event or a guest analyst on the show, such as "Worst Haircuts", "Shocking Refereeing Decisions", or "Golden Oldies." This was replaced by "2 Good, 2 Bad", which offered a humorous look at the goings on of the football weekend in England, such as embarrassing gaffes, unusual celebrations, intimacy between players and managers, or supporters falling asleep.

Studio
Ahead of the 2019–20 Premier League season BBC Sport upgraded the studio that Match of the Day, Match of the Day 2, Football Focus, and Final Score broadcasts from.

The facility uses a "4K UHD ready virtual reality studio" and uses Epic Games' Unreal Engine 4 rendering technology.

The studio is located at dock10 studios, MediaCityUK.

Scheduling
From the beginning of the 2012–13 season, Match of the Day 2 moved from BBC Two to BBC One. The BBC stated this was because "of the increased number of Premier League games played on a Sunday."

Occasionally, Match of the Day 2 either switches back to BBC Two or moves its broadcast time, to make way for other sporting events. These have included the Super Bowl, the Augusta Masters Golf Tournament, and the World Snooker Championships. On other occasions, Match of the Day 2 has been delayed to Monday night to cover a particular fixture that took place that on the Monday evening.

Presenters and analysts
Mark Chapman serves as the predominant presenter. Gabby Logan and Jason Mohammad filled-in for Chapman during the 2020–21 season.

The predominant analysts featured during the 2020–21 season, include: Tim Cahill, Dion Dublin, Jermaine Jenas, Martin Keown, Danny Murphy, Micah Richards, Alan Shearer, and Ian Wright.

Premier League licensing

2019–20 to 2021–22 seasons
In January 2018, the Premier League announced that it had awarded the UK highlights to BBC Sport. The rights package cost £211.5 million and covers three seasons from 2019 to 2020.

The January 2018 agreement also includes Match of the Day, Match of the Day 2 Extra, Match of the Day Kickabout, Football Focus, Final Score, and The Premier League Show.

References

External links

 
 
 Match of the Day 2 Extra
 Match of the Day 3

BBC Television shows
BBC Sport
2004 British television series debuts
2000s British sports television series
2010s British sports television series
2020s British sports television series
Premier League on television